The inauguration of Sergio Osmeña as the fourth president of the Philippines and the second president of the Philippine Commonwealth under the United States occurred on August 1, 1944 under extraordinary circumstances. The inauguration marked the commencement of Osmeña's only term (which lasted one year nine months and twenty-nine days) as President, following the death of President Manuel L. Quezon.

References 
 

1944 in the Philippines
Presidency of Sergio Osmeña
Osmena, Sergio